Magnus Hovdal Moan (born 26 August 1983) is a retired Norwegian Nordic combined skier who has competed since 2002 until 2019.

Background
Magnus moved from Lillehammer when he was two years old and has lived in Trondheim ever since. He skis with the Byåsen IL club. When he is not training or competing Moan works for a company called Doka Norge A/S. It is a sister-company of Doka Austria. They rent/sell shuttering accessories to building constructors.

Career
Moan finished second in the 2005–06 FIS Nordic Combined World Cup. Moan is a solid ski jumper, but his strength lies in his cross-country skiing. He won one world cup event in the 2005–06 season, in the sprint in Ramsau am Dachstein, Austria, and  finished a race outside of the top eight only once this season. In the 2004–05 season, he finished fifth, eighth in the 2003–04 season, and forty-first in the 2002–03 season.

Moan won an Olympic bronze medal in the Nordic combined on 11 February 2006 in the 15 km individual. He jumped 97.5 m and 97 m scoring 237.5 points after both jumps, leaving him one minute, forty seconds behind Georg Hettich, who won the ski jumping phase. He then skied the 15 km race in 39:44.6, 16.2 seconds behind the winner Hettich, beating fellow countryman Petter Tande in a photo finish. On 21 February 2006, Moan won a silver in the 7.5 km sprint. He completed the race in 18:34.4, 5.4 seconds behind winner Felix Gottwald of Austria.

Moan also has five medals at the FIS Nordic World Ski Championships with one gold (4 x 5 km team: 2005), two silvers (7.5 km sprint: 2005, 2007), and two bronzes (4 x 5 km team: 2007 and 2009). He also won the individual Nordic combined event at the Holmenkollen ski festival in 2005.

External links

 – click Vinnere for downloadable pdf file 
Nordic Eagles biography of Moan
 , and 

1983 births
Living people
Sportspeople from Trondheim
Holmenkollen Ski Festival winners
Nordic combined skiers at the 2006 Winter Olympics
Nordic combined skiers at the 2010 Winter Olympics
Nordic combined skiers at the 2014 Winter Olympics
Norwegian male Nordic combined skiers
Olympic Nordic combined skiers of Norway
Olympic gold medalists for Norway
Olympic silver medalists for Norway
Olympic bronze medalists for Norway
Olympic medalists in Nordic combined
FIS Nordic World Ski Championships medalists in Nordic combined
Medalists at the 2006 Winter Olympics
Medalists at the 2014 Winter Olympics
Holmenkollen medalists